Mamadi Touré (born 11 December 1952) is a Guinean politician. He served as Minister of Foreign Affairs from 2017 to 2021. Ibrahima Khalil Kaba was appointed as his successor.

References 

Living people
1952 births
Place of birth missing (living people)
Government ministers of Guinea
Foreign Ministers of Guinea
21st-century Guinean people